The Port of Naples, a port located on the Western coast of Italy, is the 11th largest seaport in Italy having an annual traffic capacity of around 25 million tons of cargo and 500,000 TEU's. It is also serves as a tourist hub, servicing an estimated 10 million people annually transiting through the port.

The port employs more than 4,800 and services more than 64,000 ships a year.

General information

History

During World War II 

During World War II, Naples was a major strategic objective in the Italian campaign. Naples was an important node of Axis naval and land communication and there was a large and very potent German military presence located in the city.

In June 1940, the port suffered damage from French bombings. 

Naples was the first large Italian city targeted by the Allies' Operation Avalanche, commencing in September 1943, with the seizure of the port being one of its primary targets. 

During the Four Days of Naples, an uprising in Naples against Nazi German Occupation Forces, 240,000 people were forced to abandon their homes along the coast in the vicinity of the port. This was a potential prelude to the destruction of the port and the district surrounding it to deny it to the Allied attackers. This threat did not, however, materialise.

Naples, along with the port was captured by allies on 1 October 1943.

Though the Germans had sank all ships located in the port, the allies had it back in operation in under a week.

Activity

In 2007 the Port of Naples handled 20,269,163 tonnes of cargo and 460,812 TEU's making it one of the busiest cargo ports in Italy and one of the largest container ports in the country.

*tonnes

Terminals

Container terminal
The terminal has a storage capacity of 1,336,000 m2, 70 mooring places, 11.5 km of docks and an annual traffic capacity of around 500,000 TEU's.

Commercial cargo

Automobile terminal
The Port of Naples has one RoRo terminal with a total length of 850 m, a land area of 120,000 m2, storage capacity of 8,000 cars and a transshipment capacity of 900,000 units per year. The daily traffic with Sicily alone is 700 vehicles per day.

In 2007 the RoRo terminal handled 370,000 trucks and 475,000 cars.

Passenger terminal
The Port of Naples is one of the largest passenger ports in Italy and one of the largest passenger ports in Europe with a total traffic of 8,988,056 people in 2007.

The cruise terminal has ten mooring places, seven mobile walkways, 12 computerised check-in desks and an annual traffic capacity of around 1.5 million passengers.

Shipyard
The shipyards are an important part of the Port of Naples. The structures of the ports shipyards consist of 3 brick-built docks and 4 floating docks.

The sector involves four large companies and 60 small workshops which undertake ship repairs, that have a total number of 2,000 employees and a turnover over US$200 million.

References

External links
 "History of the port". Port Authority of Naples.

Ports and harbours of Italy
Port